Tigre Uno (born April 4, 1981) is a Mexican professional wrestler. He is best known for his time with  Total Nonstop Action Wrestling, where he is a one-time X Division Champion. Outside of the United States he is best known for his work in Lucha Libre AAA Worldwide (AAA), where he is a former two-time holder of the AAA Cruiserweight and AAA World Tag Team Championships and the 2011 Rey de Reyes tournament winner as Extreme Tiger. Currently is working in Japan under Pro Wrestling NOAH

Professional wrestling career

Early career
After training under Rey Misterio, Tiger debuted in late 1998 at the age of just 17. Over the years he has wrestled as Tyger Mask, an imitation of the Japanese Tiger Mask character before settling on the name "Extreme Tiger" (sometimes spelled Xtreme Tiger). He first gained notoriety as part of the World Wrestling Association (WWA) in Tijuana, Baja California, which became his "home territory". He also began working for Desastre Total Ultraviolento (DTU) and Nueva Generation Xtrema (NGX), adopting a more hardcore style of wrestling that involved the use of weapons, tables, chair and ladders in the matches.

Lucha Libre AAA Worldwide (2006–2012)
Through DTU's connection to Lucha Libre AAA Worldwide (AAA) Extreme Tiger began working for the promotion in 2006, working as a rudo (bad guy) who was used in random lower to mid-card matches. After wrestling as a mid-card wrestler throughout the year, he became a técnico (good guy) in 2007. shortly after turning técnico, Tiger won the annual Alas de Oro tournament. Later in the year, he reverted to a rudo as he began teaming with Halloween and Juventud Guerrera as La Familia de Tijuana. On April 27, 2008, Extreme Tiger and Halloween  defeated The Mexican Powers (Crazy Boy and Joe Líder) to win the AAA World Tag Team Championship, his first title in AAA. The team held the title for nearly five months, although Halloween did not wrestled for part of that time, before losing the championship to La Hermandad 187 (Joe Líder and Nicho el Millonario) on September 14. After the title loss, Halloween left AAA, ending La Familia de Tijuana. Tiger then participated in the 2008 Alas de Oro, but was unable to win the tournament for the second year in a row as he was eliminated as the second to last competitor, leaving only Jack Evans and 2008 winner Aero Star.

In 2009 Extreme Tiger participated in a tournament to crown the first ever AAA Cruiserweight Champion. Tiger defeated Crazy Boy in the first round of the tournament and Jack Evans in the semi-finals. The finals was a triple threat match that also included Alan Stone and Alex Koslov, which Koslov won to become the first Cruiserweright champion. A few weeks later, at Triplemania XVII, Extreme Tiger won the Cruiserweight Title from Koslov in a multi-competitor match that also included Alan Stone and Crazy Boy. On August 21, 2009, at the 2009 Verano de Escandalo, he lost the title in an elimination match when he was the last man eliminated by Koslov following a low blow. Extreme Tiger lost the title in his first title defense. Following the Verano de Escandalo show then-champion Alex Koslov was fired (in storyline terms) from AAA and the title was vacated. Extreme Tiger was one of five participants selected to wrestle for the vacant title at Heroes Inmortales III. Tiger won his second Cruiserweight Title by winning 5-man ladder match against Sugi San, Jack Evans, Rocky Romero and Teddy Hart. In subsequent months Alex Koslov has returned to AAA as part of La Legión Extranjera and continued to make challenges to Extreme Tiger, who managed to retain the title in all of their matches. On June 6, 2010, at Triplemania XVIII Tiger lost the Cruiserweight Championship to Jack Evans in a four-way elimination match, which also included Nosawa and the man who eliminated him from the match, Christopher Daniels. Tiger's elimination was a direct result of someone coming to the ring wearing an Extreme Tiger mask, then revealing himself to be Rélampago. On March 18, 2011, Extreme Tiger defeated Carlito Caribbean Cool, El Mesías and L.A. Park to become the 2011 Rey de Reyes and earn a guaranteed shot at the AAA Mega Championship. Just three days later Extreme Tiger and Jack Evans defeated Los Maniacos (Silver King and Último Gladiador) to win the AAA World Tag Team Championship. Tiger and Evans made their first successful defense of the title on June 18 at Triplemanía XIX, defeating the TNA team of Abyss and Mr. Anderson in a steel cage match. On October 9 at Héroes Inmortales, Tiger and Evans lost the title to Abyss and Chessman in a Tables, Ladders, and Chairs match. On August 5, 2012, at Triplemanía XX, Tiger reunited with Halloween for one night to take part in a Parejas Suicidas steel cage match, featuring three other former tag teams. However, both Tiger and Halloween managed to escape the cage and avoid having to face each other in a Mask vs. Hair match. The following November, Tiger parted ways with AAA.

Pro Wrestling Noah (2010)
On October 15, 2010, Tiger made his Pro Wrestling Noah debut entering the Nippon TV Cup Junior Heavyweight Tag League teaming with Jack Evans. They would go on to lose to Atsushi Aoki and KENTA in the semifinals of the tournament.

Total Nonstop Action Wrestling

Various feuds (2013–2015)
On December 4, 2013, Tiger, working under the ring name Ultimate Tiger, made his debut for American promotion TNA, losing to Zema Ion in a match taped for TNA Xplosion. On February 25, 2014, it was confirmed that Tiger had signed with TNA and would be debuting under the ring name Tigre Uno at Lockdown on March 9. In his debut, Tigre Uno defeated Manik in a steel cage match. Four days later, Tigre made his Impact Wrestling debut, teaming with Sanada to defeat TNA World Tag Team Champions, The BroMans (Jessie Godderz and Robbie E), in a non-title match. As a result, the two received a shot at the TNA World Tag Team Championship the following week, but were defeated in a three-way match, which also included The Wolves (Davey Richards and Eddie Edwards). Tigre Uno and Sanada were then put against each other in a "best of three" match series for Sanada's TNA X Division Championship. Uno lost the series 1–2, losing the final match on April 27 at Sacrifice. From August 23 to 31, Tigre Uno worked a tour with the Japanese Wrestle-1 promotion as a late replacement for an injured Davey Richards. The tour was part of a working relationship between TNA and Wrestle-1. on May 15 edition of Impact, Tigre Uno faced X Division champion Seiya Sanada and DJ Zema in a triple threat match but failed to win the title, on the May 29 edition of Impact, Tigre faced Bram in a losing effort. At , Tigre Uno competed in a Ladder match for the TNA X Division Championship which was won by Sanada. On the July 10 edition of Impact Wrestling, Uno competed in a 20-man #1 contender Battle Royal which was won by Jeff Hardy. On the July 17 edition of Impact Wrestling, Uno competed in a Gauntlet match for the TNA X Division Championship which was won by Austin Aries. On July 31 at Destination X, Tigre Uno competed in a triple threat X Division championship qualifying match which was won by Samoa Joe. At TNA One Night Only X Travaganza, Tigre Uno defeated Petey Williams. On the August 14 edition of Impact Wrestling, Uno competed in a #1 contender X Division Elimination Scramble match which was won by Low Ki. On the August 27 edition of Impact Wrestling, Uno, Low Ki and Crazzy Steve defeated Homicide, DJ Zema, and Manik in a 6-man tag team match. On the September 3 edition of Impact Wrestling, Uno competed in a #1 contender X Division Elimination Scramble match which was won by Homicide. On the October 8 edition of Impact Wrestling, Uno and Low Ki faced James Storm and the Great Sanada in a losing effort. On the November 19 edition of Impact Wrestling, Uno competed in a four-corners match for the vacant X Division championship which was won by Low Ki. On January 23, 2015, edition of Impact Wrestling, Uno faced Khoya in a losing effort. On the April 17 edition of Impact Wrestling, Uno and Jay Rios faced Ethan Carter III and Bram in a losing effort.

X Division Champion (2015–2016)
On the May 1 edition of Impact Wrestling, Uno competed in a ladder match for the TNA X Division championship which was won by Kenny King. on the May 22 edition of Impact Wrestling, Uno competed in a six-way X Division elimination match which was won by Rockstar Spud. On June 24, 2015, Tigre Uno captured his first TNA X Division Championship defeating Low Ki and Grado in a three-way elimination match. On June 28, 2015, at Slammiversary XIII, Tigre Uno defeated Manik and DJ Z in a three-way elimination match to retain the TNA X Division Championship. At Bound for Glory, he defeated Manik, DJ Z and Andrew Everett in an Ultimate X match to retain the TNA X Division Championship. During October and November (taped in July 2015), Uno participated in the first ever TNA World Title Series tournamement. as the team of Group X Division. he would be more successful in wins of his career over the returning Mandrews, Manik and only exception of DJ Z. earning him nine successful points including no losses. and also ends of his block, tied up with DJ Z, thus advancing to the finals where he defeated TNA Knockouts Champion Gail Kim to advance the round of eight where he was defeated by Eric Young thus failing to advance the semifinals and being eliminated from the tournament. On the February 2 edition of Impact Wrestling, Uno lost the X Division Championship to Trevor Lee with help from their new manager Gregory Shane Helms. He had two chances to regain the title, on the February 9 episode of Impact Wrestling and at Lockdown, but failed to win back the championship on both occasions. On December 12, 2016, Uno announced his departure from TNA.

Independent circuit (2016–present)
In April 2016, Tigre Uno participated in a tour of the United Kingdom for Southside Wrestling Entertainment (SWE).

Return to Pro Wrestling Noah (2022–present)
On April 29, 2022, Tiger made his return to Pro Wrestling Noah defeating Seiki Yoshioka.

On May 21, 2022, Tiger unsuccessfully challenged Hayata for the GHC Junior Heavyweight Championship at Noah Dream On 2022 Final.

Championships and accomplishments

Lucha Libre AAA Worldwide
AAA Cruiserweight Championship (2 times)
AAA World Tag Team Championship (2 times) – with Halloween (1) and Jack Evans (1)
Alas de Oro (2007)
Copa Abismo Negro (2009)
Copa Gladiator (2010)
Rey de Reyes (2011)
Lucha Libre Voz
Voz Ultra Championship (1 time)
Nuevo Generation Extrema
NGX Extreme Championship (2 times)
NGX King of Deathmatch (2003)
Pro Wrestling Illustrated
Ranked #126 of the top 500 singles wrestlers in the PWI 500 in 2016
Total Nonstop Action Wrestling
TNA X Division Championship (1 time)
TNA X Division Championship Tournament (2015)
Global Impact Tournament (2015) – with Team International 
Vendetta Pro Wrestling
Vendetty Award: 2014 Match of the Year with Little Cholo & Bestia 666
Other titles
Baja California Lightweight Championship (1 time)

Luchas de Apuestas record

Personal life 
Tigre Uno is both married and has children but because he's always wrestled under the mask. His real name has not given, that part of his life nothing else. He currently lives in Tijuana on the state of Baja California.

References

1981 births
Living people
Mexican male professional wrestlers
Masked wrestlers
Expatriate professional wrestlers
People from Tijuana
Professional wrestlers from Baja California
TNA/Impact X Division Champions
AAA World Cruiserweight Champions
AAA World Tag Team Champions